This is a list of torpedo boat classes of the Royal Navy of the United Kingdom, organised chronologically by entry into service. This article's coverage is restricted to the steam-powered torpedo boats built for or acquired by the British Navy between 1876 (the date on which the Admiralty ordered the first torpedo boat to carry the self-propelled Whitehead torpedo) and 1905; the final batch of 36 steam-turbine-powered torpedo boats from 1906 to 1908 were originally rated as coastal destroyers and will be found under Cricket-class destroyers, while later torpedo boats introduced during World War 1, powered by internal combustion engines, will be found under Motor Torpedo Boats.

Torpedo boats 

Ever since the first use of spar torpedoes in the American Civil War and the Russo-Turkish War (1877–78), the world's sea powers continued to refine the small torpedo craft concept to employ the new automobile torpedoes (Whitehead torpedoes) that could continue the legacy of small and relatively inexpensive vessels able to challenge much larger vessels. The Royal Navy purchased 1st and 2nd class torpedo boats for offensive and defensive combat roles, respectively.

Later – especially to counter the French automobile defense – the British Navy primarily ordered torpedo boat catchers (or torpedo gunboats), which proved too slow for the task of dealing with torpedo boats, and subsequently torpedo boat destroyers (TBDs) - or destroyers as they soon became called.

1st class torpedo boats
First class torpedo boats were designed for independent inshore operations.  They were small, but large enough to patrol coastal waters and enjoy some limited endurance beyond their supporting port or tender.

Lightning-design 
John I. Thornycroft & Company, Chiswick. The first torpedo boat, TB.1 (originally called Lightning), was ordered on 26 January 1876 and underwent trials on 22 May 1877; her dimensions were slightly different from her successors (TB.2 onwards) which were all ordered on 3 October 1877 and notably deleted the coach roof of the prototype.

 Maudslay, Sons and Field, Lambeth
TB.13
Yarrow & Company, Poplar
TB.14
Hanna, Donald & Wilson, Paisley
TB.15
Stephen Lewin, Poole
TB.16 – not taken into service
Yarrow & Company, Limited
TB.17
TB.18
J. Samuel White, Cowes
TB.19
G. & J. Rennie, Paisley
TB.20
Des Vignes, Chertsey
TB.21 – not accepted from RN because of lack of performance; the number was thus re-used for the first of the 113-footer group.

113-Footers 
On 10 December 1883 the Admiralty wrote both to John I. Thornycroft & Company and to Yarrow & Company asking them to tender for one or more improved First Class torpedo boats.

TB.21 class
on 21 December 1883 Thornycroft replied forwarding their design HO 1992 and the specification in accordance with the Admiralty's letter. The dimensions were similar to those of the Sookhoun (Yard number 167, built 1882 for the Imperial Russian Navy) and the Childers (Yard number 172, built 1882 for the Victorian Government in Australia). Two boats (Yard numbers 201 and 202) were ordered by the Admiralty on 19 January 1884 for delivery in 9 and 10 months respectively.
 TB.21 (launched 18 March 1885 and ran trials on 30 April 1885) Sold to be broken up in Malta in 1907.
 TB.22 (launched 5 May 1885 and ran trials on 25 May 1885) Sold to be broken up in Malta in 1907.

TB.23 class
The Admiralty similarly placed orders with Yarrow for two boats (built at Poplar as Yard numbers 666 and 667).
 TB.23 (launched 1886)Sold in 1905.
 TB.24 (launched 1886)Sold in 1904.

125-Footers 
All 53 boats of this group (TB.25 to TB.79, excluding TB.39 and TB.40) carried 5 x 14-in torpedo tubes (one bow tube plus two pairs of deck tubes) and a complement of 16. Alternatively they could carry a gun armament of two 3-pounders and four MGs in lieu of the deck tubes. The bow tubes were later removed.

TB.25 class
John I. Thornycroft & Company (1885–86)
The first of these boats was ordered on 24 February 1885, and another four boats were ordered on 30/31 March 1885.

TB.30 class
Yarrow & Company, Limited (1885–86)
These four boats were ordered on 30/31 March 1885.

TB.34 class
J. Samuel White (1885–87). Based on White's TB.19 with "turnabout" stern but enlarged and built with more beam than the Thornycroft and Yarrow boats. All five took part in the 1887 Naval Review. TB.34 spent all her life in Home waters, but TB.35 and TB.36 sailed in March 1888 for the China Station, followed later by TB.37 and TB.38; these four spent all their lives on this station and were eventually sold together at Hong Kong in 1919.

100-Footers (purchases) 
Yarrow & Company, Limited
TB.39
TB.40

TB.41 class
John I. Thornycroft & Company (1886)
These twenty boats were ordered on 30 April or 1 May 1885 as Yard numbers 222 to 241, and were identical with the previous five Thornycroft boats.

TB.61 class
This batch was ordered on 30 April or 1 May 1885, one month after the TB.30 to TB.33 batch with which they were identical. The last two (TB.79 and TB.80) differed in detail and in dimensions; the 75-ton TB.79 was 128ft 8in in oa length; the 105-ton TB.80 was 134ft 9in bp by 14ft beam.

153-Footer (HMS Swift) 
J. Samuel White
TB.81

130-Footers 
(ordered under 1887-88 Programme, as repeats of TB.79)
Yarrow & Company, Limited

140-Footers 
Ten "140-footer" were ordered to four different builders' designs under the 1892-93 Programme. They were built in the same period as the first of the 26-knotter TBDs (torpedo boat destroyers) which rapidly superseded the traditional torpedo boat, and like them carried the new 18-in torpedoes. All these vessels were quickly deployed to the Mediterranean and stayed there throughout the rest of their service lives, based primarily on Gibraltar.

TB.88 class

TB.91 class
These three boats were ordered from John I. Thornycroft & Company on 4 July 1892, exactly one week after the orders were placed for Thornycroft's Daring and Decoy torpedo-boat destroyers, and thus followed them in sequence of Yard numbers.

TB.94 class
J. Samuel White

TB.97
Laird Brothers, Birkenhead

135-Footers 
(ex Royal Indian Marine boats, taken over by RN in 1892 and given numbers in 1900 instead of their original names)
John I. Thornycroft & Company
 TB.100 (ex-Baluchi)
 TB.102 (ex-Karen)
 TB.103 (ex-Pathan)
Hanna, Donald & Wilson
 TB.101 (ex-Gurkha)
J. Samuel White
 TB.104 (ex-Mahratta)
 TB.105 (ex-Sikh)
 TB.106 (ex-Rajput)

160-Footers 
The Royal Navy's thirteen 160 Footers comprised three distinct classes, each built to their constructors' own designs.

TB.98 class

These four boats, discontinuously numbered because the seven boats built for the Royal Indian Marine in 1892 were given the numbers 100 to 106, were built by Thornycroft at Chiswick to a common design. The first two (Yard numbers 346 and 347) were ordered on 21 November 1899 under the 1899-1900 Programme. The later pair (Yard numbers 351 and 352) were ordered on 25 April 1900 under the 1900-1901 Programme.

TB.109 class

Five more Thornycroft boats were built under the 1901-02 Programme to a different design, about 7% greater in displacement and being four feet longer than the TB.98 boats. The first four of these boats were ordered from Thornycroft on 11 November 1901, and the fifth on 14 December 1901. Their yard numbers were 359 to 363 respectively.

TB.114 class

The remaining four boats, similar in scale to the TB.109 models, were built by J. Samuel White at Cowes.

Cricket class

No further 1st Class torpedo boats were ordered until 1905, when twelve new vessels were projected to meet the needs for coastal defence. Such new topedo boats were proposed in December 1904 to be vessels not exceeding 165ft in length and 250 tons, carrying two 12-pounder guns and three torpedo tubes, and capable of 26 knots for 8 hours with an endurance of 1,000 nautical miles at 15 knots. Such criteria would have closely paralleled the original 27-knotter torpedo-boat destroyers of 1893-4, although the new type were to have steam turbines and oil fuel, and so the new ships were quickly re-designated as 'coastal destroyers'. Thornycroft, Yarrow and White were invited to tender, and each produced plans for a three-shaft propulsion with an astern turbine on the centre shaft; each project was larger than first required, being between 175ft and 180ft in length. 
These twelve coastal destroyers, given names rather than simply numbers, were ordered under the 1905-06 Programme to the three builders' own designs. In October 1906 these were re-classified as torpedo boats and their original names were replaced by the numbers TB.1 to TB.12. To avoid confusion with the surviving early 1st Class torpedo boats, those survivors bearing numbers up to TB.79 inclusive were renumbered to include a "0" before the number (e.g. TB.79 became TB.079). Twelve more of these new torpedo boats were ordered in the 1906-07 Programme, to enlarged designs, and a final twelve in the 1907-08 Programme; these were numbered TB.13 to TB.36.

2nd class torpedo boats 

The first 50 small torpedo boats were to be carried on larger ships or given to dedicated torpedo boat carriers, such as HMS Vulcan and HMS Hecla. With a single (US-built) exception, all were constructed by Thornycroft at Chiswick (45 boats) or by Yarrow at Poplar (4 boats). These boats were designed as harbour defence and coastal boats, but their small size meant their endurance and seakeeping abilities would be quite modest.

John I. Thornycroft & Company
No. 51 - No. 62
Herreshoff Manufacturing Company, Bristol RI
No. 63
John I. Thornycroft & Company
No. 64 - No. 73
Yarrow & Company, Limited
No. 74
No. 75
John I. Thornycroft & Company
No. 76 - No. 95
Yarrow & Company, Limited
No. 96
No. 97
John I. Thornycroft & Company
No. 98
No. 99
No. 100

See also 
 Coastal Motor Boat
 Motor Torpedo Boat
 Motor Gun Boat

References

Bibliography

 Dittmar, F.J. and Colledge, J.J. British Warships 1914–1919. London: Ian Allan, 1972. .
 

 Winfield, Rif & Lyon, David The Sail and Steam Navy List: All the Ships of the Royal Navy 1815-1889. Chatham Publishing, 2004. .

Torpedo boats
 
Royal Navy
Royal Navy torpedo boat